The following is a list of notable deaths in June 2016.

Entries for each day are listed alphabetically by surname. A typical entry lists information in the following sequence:
Name, age, country of citizenship and reason for notability, established cause of death, reference.

June 2016

1
William Harrison Bell, 89, American surgeon.
Leonard Boyle, 85, New Zealand Roman Catholic prelate, Bishop of Dunedin (1983–2005).
Agostino Coletto, 88, Italian racing cyclist.
David Daniell, 87, English literary scholar. 
Roger Enrico, 71, American businessman (PepsiCo, DreamWorks), snorkeling incident.
Razak Khan, 65, Indian film actor (Baadshah, Hello Brother, Akhiyon Se Goli Maare), heart attack.
Boyce F. Martin Jr., 80, American judge, Chief Judge of the United States Court of Appeals for the Sixth Circuit (1996–2003), brain cancer.
Grigore Obreja, 48, Romanian sprint canoeist, world champion (1994), Olympic bronze medallist (1996).
Kosit Panpiemras, 73, Thai banker (Bangkok Bank), cancer.
Bob Rumball, 86, Canadian pastor and deaf rights advocate.
John Simpson, 89, Australian Olympic fencer.
Dalpat Singh Paraste, 66, Indian politician, MP for Shahdol (2004–2009), brain hemorrhage.
David Spielberg, 77, American actor (Christine, Wiseguy, ER).
John Taylor, 87, British Anglican bishop and theologian.
 Wang Jui, 85, Taiwanese actor, Golden Bell winner (1991, 1997, 2014).

2
Klaus Biemann, 89, Austrian-born American biochemist.
Walter Curley, 93, American diplomat, Ambassador to Ireland (1975–1977) and France (1989–1993).
Alvin J. DeGrow, 90, American politician.
Donny Everett, 19, American baseball player (Vanderbilt Commodores), drowned.
Fulvio Galimi, 89, Argentine Olympic fencer (1948, 1952).
Darko Grubor, 53, Serbian executive.
Don Hardeman, 63, American football player.
Sir Tom Kibble, 83, British physicist.
Wayne Kingery, 88, American football player (Baltimore Colts).
Pál Koczka, 77, Hungarian Olympic basketball player.
Keith Lawrence, 96, New Zealand-born British flight lieutenant during World War II, surviving member of The Few.
Yevhen Lemeshko, 85, Ukrainian football coach.
Abderrahmane Meziani, 74, Algerian footballer (USM Alger).
Dan Henry Nicolson, 82, American botanist.
Andrzej Niemczyk, 72, Polish volleyball coach, European champion (2003, 2005).
Sir John Pidgeon, 89, Australian property developer.
Ulrik Plesner, 85, Danish architect.
Lee Pfund, 96, American baseball player (Brooklyn Dodgers) and college baseball and basketball coach (Wheaton College).
Willis Pyle, 101, American animator (Pinocchio, Bambi, Mr. Magoo).
Brian Reidy, 77, New Zealand rugby league player (Auckland, national team).
Helen Renton, 85, British air force officer, director of the WRAF (1980–1986).
Freddie Wadling, 64, Swedish singer and songwriter.
Häns'che Weiss, 64–65, German jazz guitarist.

3
Yevgeny Agureyev, 65, Russian field hockey player and administrator.
Muhammad Ali, 74, American boxer, Olympic gold medalist (1960), three-time WBC world heavyweight champion (1964, 1974, 1978), septic shock.
Balu Anand, 61, Indian actor, heart attack.
Szabolcs Baranyi, 72, Hungarian tennis player.
Sreten Asanović, 85, Montenegrin author.
Adolph Cornelis van Bruggen, 86, Dutch malacologist.
Henry Childs, 65, American football player (New Orleans Saints), heart attack.
Mac Cocker, 74, English-born Australian radio presenter (2JJ, 105.7 ABC Darwin).
Stephen Gasiorowicz, 87, American theoretical physicist.
Vladimir Ivanovsky, 68, Russian diplomat, Ambassador to Turkey (2007–2013).
Jocelyn Lovell, 65, Canadian Olympic cyclist (1968, 1972, 1976), Commonwealth (1978) and Pan American Games (1971, 1975) gold medalist.
Sten Lundin, 84, Swedish motocross racer, world champion (1959, 1961).
Leonard Marchand, 82, Canadian politician, Minister of Environment (1976, 1977–1979), Senator (1984–1998), first Aboriginal federal cabinet minister.
Joseph Michel, 90, Belgian politician, President of the Belgian Chamber of Representatives (1980–1981), Minister of the Interior (1974–1977, 1986–1988).
Ken Morioka, 49, Japanese musician and composer (Soft Ballet), heart failure.
Murray Murrell, 93, Australian football player (Collingwood).
Victor Reux, 86, French Saint Pierre and Miquelon politician.
Luis Salom, 24, Spanish motorcycle racer, race collision.
Sabam Siagian, 84, Indonesian journalist, editor-in-chief of The Jakarta Post (1983–1991), Ambassador to Australia (1991–1994).
Arve Solstad, 80, Norwegian newspaper editor (Dagbladet).
Dave Swarbrick, 75, British folk musician and singer-songwriter (Fairport Convention), emphysema.
Henrique N'zita Tiago, 88, Angolan separatist politician, President of the Armed Forces of Cabinda.

4
Gil Bartosh, 86, American football player and coach.
Frank Brown, 79, American Olympic skier.
Annie Castledine, 77, British theatre director.
Eamonn Cooke, 79, Irish DJ and criminal.
Phyllis Curtin, 94, American soprano.
Bobby Curtola, 73, Canadian singer.
Sulabha Deshpande, 79, Indian actress.
István Halász, 64, Hungarian footballer (Tatabánya, Vasas, national team).
Antti Hyry, 84, Finnish writer.
Geirmund Ihle, 81, Norwegian politician, MP (1969–1981).
Nicky Jennings, 70, English footballer (Portsmouth, Exeter City).
Rodney Johnson, 88, Australian Olympic sports shooter.
Zoya Klyuchko, 83, Ukrainian entomologist.
Piero Leddi, 85, Italian painter.
Erich Linemayr, 83, Austrian football referee.
Norman Longmate, 90, English historian.
Sir Brian McGrath, 90, British courtier, private secretary to the Duke of Edinburgh.
Carmen Pereira, 79, Bissau-Guinean politician, acting President (1984).
Pulu Poumele, 44, American football player (San Diego Chargers, Baltimore Ravens).
Alan Rathbone, 57, English rugby league player (Bradford, Warrington).
Bill Richmond, 94, American screenwriter and producer (The Carol Burnett Show, The Nutty Professor, Three's Company).
Farid Seiful-Mulyukov, 85, Uzbek-born Russian journalist and writer.
Bill Snowden, 81, New Zealand rugby league player (Ponsonby, national team).
Nicola Tanda, 87, Italian literary critic and philologist.
William Wright, 85, American author.
Mustafa Zalmi, 92, Iraqi Kurdish Muslim scholar.

5
Loretta Abbott, 83, American dancer and choreographer.
Manohar Aich, 104, Indian bodybuilder, Mr. Universe (1952).
Gianluca Buonanno, 50, Italian politician, MEP (since 2014), traffic collision.
Jerome Bruner, 100, American psychologist.
David Gilkey, 50, American photojournalist, grenade explosion.
Frank Griffin, 98, Irish judge.
Taomati Iuta, 77, I-Kiribati politician, Vice President (1991–1994) and Speaker of the House (2003, 2007–2015), diabetes.
David Lamb, 76, American war correspondent and journalist (Los Angeles Times).
Abu Layla, 32, Syrian military commander, shot.
Ortensia, 10, Australian thoroughbred racehorse, euthanized.
Jarbas Passarinho, 96, Brazilian politician, Minister of Justice (1990–1992), Senate President (1981–1983), Governor of Pará (1964–1966).
Cedric Robinson, 76, American political scientist.
Patti Grace Smith, 68, American Federal Aviation Administration official, pancreatic cancer.
Rick Speare, 68, Australian public health physician, traffic collision.
Eleanor Zelliot, 89, American scholar.
Aleksei Zharkov, 68, Russian actor, liver disease.

6
Stuart Anderson, 93, American restaurateur (Black Angus Steakhouse).
Rhoda Blumberg, 98, American author. 
Theresa Poh Lin Chan, 72, Singaporean writer and actress, lung cancer.
Helen Fabela Chávez, 88, American labor unionist.
Hélio Garcia, 85, Brazilian politician, Governor of Minas Gerais (1984–1987, 1991–1995).
Harry Gregory, 72, English footballer (Charlton Athletic). 
John Harding, 2nd Baron Harding of Petherton, 88, British army officer and peer.
Ayaz Jani, 48, Pakistani poet and journalist.
Viktor Korchnoi, 85, Russian-born Swiss chess player.
Basil McKenzie, 89, Jamaican Olympic sprinter.
Remi Nadeau, 95, American historian.
Federico José Pagura, 93, Argentinian Protestant minister, Bishop of the Evangelical Methodist Church of Argentina.
Steve Pisanos, 96, Greek-born American air force officer.
Theresa Saldana, 61, American actress (Raging Bull, The Commish, I Wanna Hold Your Hand), renal failure.
Rolf Schweizer, 80, German composer.
Sir Peter Shaffer, 90, British playwright (Amadeus, Equus, Black Comedy) and screenwriter, Tony (1975, 1981) and Oscar winner (1985).
Kimbo Slice, 42, Bahamian-born American mixed martial artist (Bellator, UFC), boxer and actor (Merry Christmas, Drake & Josh), heart failure.
Keith Smith, 87, New Zealand cricketer.
Tunga, 64, Brazilian sculptor and performance artist, cancer.
André Warusfel, 79, French mathematician and writer.
Jimmy Williams, 90, Canadian baseball player and manager.
Héctor Zumbado, 84, Cuban writer and comedian.

7
Børge Bach, 71, Danish footballer (AaB).
Bretagne, 16, American Golden Retriever rescue dog, euthanized after kidney failure.
Johnny Brooks, 84, English footballer (Tottenham Hotspur, Chelsea, Brentford).
John H. Eicher, 95, American scientist and author.
Tanju Gürsu, 77, Turkish actor and film director, respiratory failure.
Amber Gurung, 78, Nepalese musician and composer (national anthem).
Frans Harjawiyata, 84, Indonesian Roman Catholic abbot.
Robert Hall, 85, Canadian politician.
Leonard Hill, 68, American television executive and writer, property developer.
Peter Jost, 95, British mechanical engineer.
Stephen Keshi, 54, Nigerian football player (Anderlecht, Strasbourg) and manager (national team), heart attack.
Sir Graham Latimer, 90, New Zealand Māori leader and politician.
Marita Lindquist, 97, Finnish writer.
Thomas Perkins, 84, American businessman (Kleiner Perkins Caufield & Byers).
Anatoliy Polishchuk, 66, Soviet-Ukrainian volleyball player, Olympic silver medalist (1976).
Rubén Quevedo, 37, Venezuelan baseball player (Chicago Cubs, Milwaukee Brewers), heart attack.
Elayne Rapping, 77, American writer, breast cancer.
Sean Rooks, 46, American basketball player (Dallas Mavericks, Minnesota Timberwolves, Los Angeles Lakers), heart disease.
Didargylyç Urazow, 39, Turkmen footballer, stroke.
Bryan Wiedmeier, 56, American sports executive (Miami Dolphins, Cleveland Browns, NFL Management Council), brain cancer.
Rod Zimmer, 73, Canadian politician, Senator for Manitoba (2005–2013), complications from esophageal cancer and pneumonia.

8
Smart Akraka, 82, Nigerian Olympic sprinter.
Pierre Aubert, 89, Swiss politician, President (1983, 1987).
Terje Fjærn, 73, Norwegian musician and conductor. 
Sascha Lewandowski, 44, German football manager (Bayer Leverkusen, Union Berlin).
Qahhor Mahkamov, 84, Tajik politician, President (1990–1991).
Philip Majerus, 79, American biochemist, prostate cancer. 
Marina Malfatti, 83, Italian actress (The Night Evelyn Came Out of the Grave, The Red Queen Kills Seven Times, Black Killer).
Michael Manser, 87, British architect, complications from a stroke.
Ngala Mwendwa, 94, Kenyan politician.
William Smith, 62, Northern Irish paramilitary and politician.
Robert Sussman, 74, American anthropologist, stroke.

9
Hamza Ali, 20, English cricketer (Hampshire), drowning.
Michael Baldasaro, 67, Canadian sect leader (Church of the Universe) and political candidate (Marijuana Party), cancer.
Stepan Bondarev, 93, Belarusian Soviet army general. 
Alex Tamba Brima, 44, Sierra Leonean military commander (Armed Forces Revolutionary Council), convicted of war crimes and crimes against humanity during the Civil War.
Stéphane Dumas, 46, Canadian astrophysicist, complications from influenza.
Carillo Gritti, 74, Italian-born Brazilian Roman Catholic prelate, Territorial Prelate of Itacoatiara (since 2000).
T. S. John, 76, Indian politician, chairman of the Kerala Congress. 
J. Reilly Lewis, 71, American choral conductor and Baroque music specialist, heart attack.
James Lewis, 85, American politician, member of the Indiana Senate (1974–1978, 1986–2010) and House of Representatives (1970–1972). 
Hassan Muhammad Makki, 82, Yemeni politician, Prime Minister (1974).
Panagiotis Mavrikos, 42, Greek newspaper publisher, traffic collision.
Bernard Shrimsley, 85, British newspaper editor (The Sun, News of the World).
Brooks Thompson, 45, American basketball player (Orlando Magic) and coach (UTSA Roadrunners), multiple organ failure.
A. Gordon Wetmore, 84, American theologian, President of the Northwest Nazarene College (1983–1992).
Madeleen de Wijkerslooth de Weerdesteyn, 80, Dutch politician, member of the Senate (1980–1987) and Council of State (1987–2002).

10
Shuaibu Amodu, 58, Nigerian football coach (Nigeria national football team).
Mary Feik, 92, American aviator.
Alexander Gorlov, 85, Russian mechanical engineer.
Alex Govan, 86, Scottish footballer (Plymouth Argyle, Birmingham City).
Christina Grimmie, 22, American singer-songwriter (Find Me) and talent show participant (The Voice), shot.
Gopal Gurung, 80, Nepali politician and author.
Habib, 68, Iranian singer, heart attack.
Margaret Vinci Heldt, 98, American hairstylist, creator of the beehive hairstyle.
Ambrose Hickey, 71, Irish Gaelic footballer (Offaly GAA).
Desmond Heeley, 85, British set and costume designer.
John Horgan, 66, Irish hurler (Cork).
Gordie Howe, 88, Canadian Hall of Fame ice hockey player (Detroit Red Wings, Hartford Whalers).
Giannis Michalopoulos, 89, Greek actor.
Mimmo Palmara, 87, Italian actor (A Long Ride from Hell, Hercules and the Conquest of Atlantis, Hercules Unchained).
Alfred Oftedal Telhaug, 81, Norwegian educationalist.
Giuseppe Virgili, 80, Italian footballer (Fiorentina, national team).
Derek Wilson, 93, New Zealand architect and environmentalist.

11
Rudi Altig, 79, German cyclist, winner of the 1962 Vuelta a España, world champion (1966), cancer.
Asghar Bichareh, 89, Iranian photographer and actor.
Gilbert Blue, 82, American Catawba chief (1973–2007), mesothelioma.
Stacey Castor, 48, American convicted murderer, heart attack.
Chico Fernández, 84, Cuban baseball player (Detroit Tigers), complications from a stroke.
Paolo Leon, 81, Italian post-Keynesian economist.
Inder Malhotra, 86, Indian journalist (The Guardian), editor (The Statesman, The Times of India) and columnist.
Moonist, 5, American racehorse, complications of colic.
Alberto Remedios, 81, British operatic tenor.
Bryan Robinson, 41, American football player (Chicago Bears, Cincinnati Bengals, Arizona Cardinals).
Trudi Roth, 86, Swiss actress, dementia.
Thomas Skidmore, 83, American historian.
Lars Skytøen, 86, Norwegian politician, Minister of Industry (1979–1981).
Veijo Valtonen, 80, Finnish footballer.

12
Abdullah Ahmad, 79, Malaysian newspaper editor (New Straits Times), journalist and politician, cancer.
Georgia Apostolou, 43, Greek actress (Erotas), heart attack.
David K. Backus, 63, American economist, leukemia.
Donald Carr, 89, English cricketer (Derbyshire, Oxford University, national team) and administrator (MCC, TCCB).
Michelle Cliff, 69, Jamaican-born American writer, liver failure.
Gordon Connell, 93, American actor (Hello, Dolly!).
Vladimir Dolgopolov, 54, Soviet and Russian football player (FC Zenit Saint Petersburg), complications from a stroke.
Robert F. Dorr, 76, American writer and diplomat, brain tumor.
Franco Faggi, 90, Italian rower, Olympic gold medalist (1948).  
Earl Faison, 77, American football player (San Diego Chargers).
Dagfinn Gedde-Dahl, 79, Norwegian physician.
Gunnar Gran, 84, Norwegian media executive (NRK).
P. V. Guharaj, 91, Indian police surgeon.
Curley Johnson, 80, American football player (New York Jets), Super Bowl winner (1969).
Danny Kopec, 62, American chess player, pancreatic cancer.
Harold La Borde, 82, Trinidadian sailor, fall.
Achyut Lahkar, 85, Indian actor and playwright.
Rodney Leach, Baron Leach of Fairford, 82, British banker and politician.
Tom Leppard, 80, British tattooed man.
Omar Mateen, 29, American mass murderer (Orlando nightclub shooting), shot.
Michu Meszaros, 76, Hungarian-born American actor (ALF).
Elín Ortiz, 81, Puerto Rican actor, comedian, and producer, Alzheimer's disease.
Fabrizio Pirovano, 56, Italian motorcycle road racer, tumour.
Alfonso Portugal, 82, Mexican footballer (national team).
Jerry Vaflor, 76, Filipino football player and coach, pneumonia.
George Voinovich, 79, American politician, Senator from Ohio (1999–2011), Governor of Ohio (1991–1998), Mayor of Cleveland (1980–1989).
Janet Waldo, 96, American actress and voice artist (The Jetsons, The Flintstones, Wacky Races).
Chris Warren, 49, American musician (WWF).
Cezary Wodziński, 57, Polish philosopher, historian, essayist and translator (Jagiellonian University, University of Warsaw).

13
Anahid Ajemian, 92, American violinist.
Uriah Asante, 24, Ghanaian footballer (Hearts of Oak), heart attack.
John Arnold Baker, 90, British judge and politician. 
Irene Bauer, 71, Norwegian politician.
Tony Byrne, 70, Irish footballer (Hereford, Southampton).
Tet Garcia, 75, Filipino politician.
Gladys Gunzer, 76, American sculptor.
Ofelya Hambardzumyan, 91, Armenian folk singer.
Oleg Karavaychuk, 88, Soviet and Russian composer.
Joshua Wanume Kibedi, 74, Ugandan diplomat and politician, Foreign Minister (1971–1973), Ambassador to the United Nations (1986–1988).
Randy Jones, 72, British-born American jazz musician (Chet Baker, Dave Brubeck, Maynard Ferguson), heart failure.
Ron Mason, 76, Canadian ice hockey coach and university administrator (Michigan State).
Mohammad Moniruzzaman Miah, 81, Bangladeshi academic.
Chips Moman, 79, American songwriter ("(Hey Won't You Play) Another Somebody Done Somebody Wrong Song") and record producer, Grammy winner (1976).
Mudrarakshas, 82, Indian Hindi author.
 Robert T. Paine, 83, American ecologist, acute myeloid leukemia.
Gregory Rabassa, 94, American literary translator (Hopscotch).
Gerald J. Wasserburg, 89, American geologist.

14
Lidia Biondi, 75, Italian actress (Eat Pray Love, Casanova, Rome). 
Roger Breeze, 69, English veterinary scientist.  
Robert Després, 91, Canadian businessman, lung cancer.
Anatol Dumitraș, 60, Moldovan singer, cancer.
Melvin Dwork, 94, American interior designer and gay rights activist.
Ronnie Claire Edwards, 83, American actress (The Waltons, The Dead Pool, Designing Women), chronic obstructive pulmonary disease.
Anatoli Grishin, 76, Russian sprint canoeist, Olympic champion (1964).
Ann Morgan Guilbert, 87, American actress (The Dick Van Dyke Show, The Nanny, Grumpier Old Men), cancer.
Per Hovdenakk, 80, Norwegian art historian.
Gertrude Kerbis, 89, American architect (O'Hare International Airport), liver cancer.
OJB Jezreel, 49, Nigerian singer and record producer, complications from kidney failure.
Gilles Lamontagne, 97, Canadian politician, Lieutenant Governor of Quebec (1984–1990), MP (1977–1984), Mayor of Quebec City (1965–1977).
Ali Lazrak, 68, Dutch politician, member of the House of Representatives (2002–2006), lung cancer.
Henry McCullough, 72, Northern Irish guitarist (Spooky Tooth, Wings, The Grease Band).
Samuel Mumbengegwi, 73, Zimbabwean politician.
Ken Orr, 77, American software engineer.
Irma Roy, 84, Argentine actress and politician, national deputy (1995–2005).
Ovie Scurlock, 97, American jockey.
Yumi Shirakawa, 79, Japanese actress (Rodan, The Mysterians, The H-Man).

15
Somawansa Amarasinghe, 73, Sri Lankan politician, leader of Janatha Vimukthi Peramuna (1994–2014), stroke.
Anton Barten, 86, Dutch economist.
Claude Confortès, 88, French actor (War of the Buttons).
Lois Duncan, 82, American writer (I Know What You Did Last Summer, Hotel for Dogs, Who Killed My Daughter?).
Aslam Farrukhi, 92, Pakistani writer and critic.
Gypsy Joe, 82, Puerto Rican professional wrestler (WWC, CWA, AJPW).
David Hall, 88, New Zealand chemistry academic (University of Auckland).
Roland Hardy, 90, British Olympic race walker (1952, 1956). 
Bob Holman, 79, British academic (University of Bath) and community worker, motor neurone disease.
Joaquin Jackson, 80, American Texas Ranger.
Fred James, 71, Canadian football player (Calgary Stampeders).
Ladislav Kupkovič, 80, Slovak composer and conductor.
Milorad Mandić, 55, Serbian actor (Selo gori, a baba se češlja, Pretty Village, Pretty Flame, Klopka), heart attack. 
Hiroshi Minatoya, 72, Japanese judoka, world champion (1967, 1969).
Alavi Moulana, 84, Sri Lankan politician, Minister of Labour (2000–2001), Governor of Western Province (2002–2015).
Harry Moule, 94, English cricketer (Worcestershire).
Richard Selzer, 87, American surgeon and author.
Giuseppe Spagnulo, 79, Italian sculptor.
A. C. Tirulokchandar, 86, Indian film director (Iru Malargal, Deiva Magan, Adhey Kangal).
John Tremelling, 86, Australian Olympic sports shooter.
Elaina Marie Tuttle, 52, ornithologist and behavioral geneticist

16
Sulo Aittoniemi, 79, Finnish politician, MP (1987–2003).
Bill Berkson, 76, American poet and art critic, heart attack.
Doug Cherry, 83, Canadian politician.
Jo Cox, 41, British politician, MP for Batley and Spen (since 2015), shot and stabbed.
Manimala Devi, 84, Indian actress (Kaa).
Wayne Dowd, 74, American politician, member of the Arkansas Senate (1978–2000), cancer. 
Anjan Dutta, 64, Indian politician.
Hans Lipschis, 96, Lithuanian-born German military officer.
Luděk Macela, 65, Czech footballer, Olympic gold medalist (1980).
Irving Moskowitz, 88, American businessman and philanthropist.
Candy Ruff, 65, American politician, member of the Kansas House of Representatives (1993–2009).
Pat Suggate, 94, British-born New Zealand geologist.
Jerome Teasley, 67, American drummer, complications from liver and lung cancer.
Charles Thompson, 98, American pianist.

17
Rubén Aguirre, 82, Mexican actor (El Chavo del Ocho, El Chapulín Colorado, Chespirito).
Willy Andresen, 94, Norwegian jazz pianist.
Attrell Cordes, 46, American rhythm and blues singer (P.M. Dawn), renal disease.
Angel Gelmi Bertocchi, 78, Italian-born Bolivian Roman Catholic prelate, Auxiliary Bishop of Cochabamba (1985–2013).
Audrey Disbury, 82, English cricketer.
Peter Feuchtwanger, 76, German-born British pianist, composer and piano teacher.
Thomas Ashley Graves Jr., 91, American academic, President of the College of William & Mary (1971–1985).
Bud Gregory, 90, Canadian politician.
Phil Hennigan, 70, American baseball player (Cleveland Indians, New York Mets), lung cancer.
Sam Beaver King, 90, Jamaican-born British political activist, Mayor of Southwark (1983), co-founder of the Notting Hill Carnival.
Reidar Kvaal, 100, Norwegian WWII military officer.
Ron Lester, 45, American actor (Varsity Blues, Popular, Good Burger), liver and kidney failure.
David Morgenthaler, 96, American businessman (Morgenthaler Ventures).
Loretto Petrucci, 86, Italian racing cyclist.
Tenor Fly, 48, English rapper and ragga vocalist.
Wang Sichao, 77, Chinese astronomy scholar, cerebral hemorrhage.

18
Paul Cox, 76, Dutch-born Australian film director (My First Wife, A Woman's Tale, Exile), liver cancer.
Sharon Douglas, 95, American actress (Fog Island). 
Susana Duijm, 79, Venezuelan beauty queen, Miss World winner (1955).
Alejandro Jano Fuentes, 45, American singer (La Voz... México), shot. 
Graham Gibbons, 96, Bermudian businessman and politician, Mayor of Hamilton, Bermuda (1972–1988).
Jim Harrison, 80, American writer and artist, heart attack.
Curt Hofstad, 70, American politician, member of the North Dakota House of Representatives (since 2006), heart attack.
Väinö Huhtala, 80, Finnish cross-country skier, Olympic champion (1960). 
Jeppiaar, 85, Indian educationist, founder and chancellor of Sathyabama University.
Sverre Kjelsberg, 69, Norwegian musician (The Pussycats).
William J. Livsey, 85, American army general.
Sibe Mardešić, 89, Croatian mathematician.
Rachel McCulloch, 74, American economist.
Vittorio Merloni, 83, Italian entrepreneur and industrialist, founder of Indesit Company.
Robert L. Moore, 73, American psychologist.
Kitty Rhoades, 65, American politician, member of the Wisconsin State Assembly (1999–2011), pneumonia.
Stanisław Romik, 90, Polish shooter.
Joe Schaffernoth, 78, American baseball player (Chicago Cubs, Cleveland Indians), cancer.
Edith Turner, 95, English-born American anthropologist. 
*Wu Jianmin, 77, Chinese diplomat, Ambassador to France and the Netherlands (1998–2003), traffic collision.

19
Mihnea Berindei, 68, Romanian-born French historian.
Nicolae Bocșan, 68, Romanian historian.
*Nicolás García Uriburu, 78, Argentine artist and landscape architect. 
Götz George, 77, German actor (Tatort).
Fan Ho, 84, Chinese photographer, film director and actor, pneumonia.
David Johnson, 83, Australian-born American business executive (Campbell Soup Company).
John Love, 73, British-born Australian scientist. 
*Ricardo Obregón Cano, 99, Argentine politician, Governor of Córdoba (1973–1974).
Allan Paivio, 91, Canadian psychologist. 
Ixora Rojas Paz, 60, Venezuelan lawyer and politician, president of the Chamber of Deputies (1998–1999).
Victor Stănculescu, 88, Romanian general and politician, Minister of National Defence.
Norbert Thériault, 95, Canadian politician, MLA (1960–1979) and Senator for New Brunswick (1979–1996).
Niki Tobi, 75, Nigerian judge, Associate Justice of the Supreme Court (2002–2010).
Randolph Vigne, 87, South African political activist.
Anton Yelchin, 27, Soviet-born American actor (Star Trek, Alpha Dog, Fright Night), blunt traumatic asphyxia.

20
Ann Atwater, 80, American civil rights activist. 
Frank Chapot, 84, American equestrian, Olympic silver medalist (1960, 1972).
Fiqre Crockwell, 30, Bermudian cricket player, shot.
Eamonn Dolan, 48, Irish football player and coach, cancer. 
Alvin Endt, 82, American politician, member of the Mississippi House of Representatives (1984–1999).
Benoîte Groult, 96, French journalist, writer and feminist activist.
Bill Ham, 79, American band manager (ZZ Top).
Hal Holman, 93, Australian artist.
Michał Józefczyk, 69, Polish Roman Catholic priest.
Aulis Kähkönen, 85, Finnish Olympic swimmer.
Willie Logie, 83, Scottish footballer (Rangers).
Ernesto Maceda, 81, Filipino politician, Senate President (1996–1998), Senator (1971–1972, 1987–1998) and columnist, multiple organ failure.
Dan Maraya, 69, Nigerian griot.
Rich Olive, 66, American politician, member of the Iowa Senate (2007–2011), cancer.
Edgard Pisani, 97, French politician, philosopher and writer, President of the AWI (1988–1995), High Commissioner of New Caledonia (1985), Minister of Agriculture (1961–1966).
William Craig Rice, 61, American academic.
Chayito Valdez, 71, Mexican-born American folk singer and actress, complications from a cerebral hemorrhage.
James Victor, 76, American actor (Stand and Deliver, Zorro).

21
Guda Anjaiah, 60, Indian poet, singer and lyricist, kidney ailment.
Jim Boyd, 60, American singer-songwriter.
Karl Dallas, 85, British journalist, author and campaigner, cancer.
Dan Daniel, 82, American radio personality (WMCA, WYNY, WCBS).
Bryan Edwards, 85, British footballer (Bolton Wanderers).
Helen T. Edwards, 80, American physicist.
Pat Friday, 94, American singer.
Jack Fuller, 69, American journalist and publisher (Tribune Publishing), cancer.
Kunio Hatoyama, 67, Japanese politician.
Henk Hofland, 88, Dutch journalist, columnist and writer.
Al Howie, 70, Canadian long distance runner.
Wayne Jackson, 74, American musician (The Mar-Keys, The Memphis Horns), heart failure.
Pierre Lalonde, 75, Canadian singer and television host, complications from Parkinson's disease.
Kenworth Moffett, 81, American art curator (Boston Museum of Fine Arts), museum director (Museum of Art Fort Lauderdale) and writer.
Mohammed Nizamuddin, 83, Indian trade unionist and politician. 
Jim Randell, 87, Australian politician, member of the Queensland Legislative Assembly for Mirani (1980–1994).

22
Joan Acker, 92, American sociologist.
John William Ashe, 61, Antiguan diplomat, President of the United Nations General Assembly (2013–2014), heart attack.
Vasily Bochkaryov, 67, Russian politician.
Steve French, 56, American gospel singer (Kingdom Heirs), suicide by jumping.
John Garrow, 87, British nutritionist and physician.
Luis Gutiérrez Martín, 84, Spanish Roman Catholic prelate, Bishop of Segovia (1995–2007).
Mike Hart, 72, British singer-songwriter.
David J. Hickson, 85, British organisational theorist.
Mohammad Kilani, Jordanian politician, Water Minister (1989).
Andrzej Kondratiuk, 79, Polish film director (Hydrozagadka), screenwriter, actor and cinematographer.
Roberto Lovera, 93, Uruguayan basketball player, Olympic bronze medalist (1952).
Alan Mitchell, 55, English comics creator.
J. V. Ramana Murthi, 83, Indian actor.
Yaşar Nuri Öztürk, 71, Turkish theologian and politician, stomach cancer.
Harry Rabinowitz, 100, British music composer (Reilly, Ace of Spies) and conductor (Chariots of Fire, Cats).
Samir Roychoudhury, 82, Indian writer (Hungry Generation).
Tokia Russell, 38, Bermudian footballer, traffic collision.
Amjad Sabri, 45, Pakistani qawwali singer, shot.

23
Eoin Cameron, 65, Australian radio presenter (6WF) and politician, MP for Stirling (1993–1998), heart attack.
Mike Flynn, 48, American online journalist and conservative activist.
Arie Gluck, 86, Israeli Olympic runner (1952). 
James Green, 71, American historian, leukemia.
Michael Herr, 76, American author (Dispatches) and screenwriter (Full Metal Jacket, Apocalypse Now).
Shirley Fenton Huie, 91, Australian author.
*Jin Yaqin, 91, Chinese actress (You and Me), cancer.
Shelley Moore, 84, British-born American jazz singer.
Stanley Mandelstam, 87, American theoretical physicist.
Peter Morley, 91, German-born British filmmaker.
Stuart Nisbet, 82, American actor (Casino, In the Heat of the Night, Bewitched).
Ralph Stanley, 89, American bluegrass musician (The Stanley Brothers), Grammy winner (2002), skin cancer.
Peter Tennant, 74, English cricketer.
Rane Vaskivuori, 49, Finnish designer.

24
Francisco Ivens de Sá Dias Branco, 81, Brazilian billionaire businessman.
Kenneth Charles Brown, 91, Canadian diplomat, Ambassador to Sweden, Haiti and Cuba.
Charles Chaynes, 90, French composer.
Tony Feher, 60, American sculptor, liver cancer.
Asım Can Gündüz, 60, Turkish rock guitarist, heart attack.
Steven Hancock, 58, British Olympic kayaker (1980) and business executive (VidWrx Inc.), traffic collision.
Chaim Avrohom Horowitz, 83, American Chasidic rabbi of the Boston Hasidic dynasty.
Donald Jelinek, 82, American civil rights lawyer, lung disease.
Allah Dino Khaskheli, 50, Pakistani singer, traffic collision.
Andries Kinsbergen, 89, Belgian politician, Governor of Antwerp (1967–1993).
James Lee, 36, American football player (Green Bay Packers), complications from diabetes.
Kelly Mader, 64, American rancher and politician, heart attack.
Edoardo Müller, 78, Italian opera conductor.
Oscar Obert, 85, American handball player.
Greg Pierce, 66, Australian rugby league player and captain (Cronulla Sharks, national team), cancer.
Gerald Walpin, 84, American attorney and author.
Bernie Worrell, 72, American musician (Parliament-Funkadelic), lung cancer.

25
Raymond Bateman, 88, American politician, New Jersey state senator (1968–1978).
Percy Beake, 99, Canadian-born British WWII fighter pilot.
Antonin Canavese, 87, French cyclist.
Nicole Courcel, 84, French actress (Rendezvous in July, Sundays and Cybele).
Jack Cropp, 89, New Zealand yachtsman, Olympic gold medalist (1956).  
Bill Cunningham, 87, American fashion photographer (The New York Times).
Maurice G. Dantec, 57, French science fiction writer and musician.
Giuseppe Ferrara, 83, Italian film director (The Moro Affair, One Hundred Days in Palermo, Giovanni Falcone).
Steve Ferrughelli, 67, Canadian football player (Montreal Alouettes).
Shōichi Fujimori, 89, Japanese royal steward.
Jim Hickman, 79, American baseball player (New York Mets, Chicago Cubs).
Peter Hutton, 71, American film director, cancer.
Farrakh Khan, 77, Pakistani army general, Chief of General Staff (1991–1994).
Hal Lear, 81, American basketball player (Temple University).
Patrick Mayhew, Baron Mayhew of Twysden, 86, British barrister and politician, Secretary of State for Northern Ireland (1992–1997).
Mohapatra Nilamani Sahoo, 89, Indian writer, multiple organ failure.
Ben Patterson, 82, American artist and musician.
Julie Plawecki, 54, American politician, member of the Michigan House of Representatives (since 2015), heart attack.
Adam Small, 79, South African writer and poet, complications from surgery.
Ermin Smrekar, 85, Italian architect.
Trevor Steedman, 62, British actor and stuntman (Aliens, Snatch, Children of Men), complications from a stroke.
Elliot Wolff, 61, American songwriter and music producer. (body discovered on this date)

26
Jürgen von Beckerath, 96, German Egyptologist.
Austin Clarke, 81, Canadian novelist (The Polished Hoe).
Sergei Cortez, 81, Chilean-born Belarusian composer.
Kristiina Elstelä, 73, Finnish actress.
Jona Goldrich, 88, Polish-born American real estate developer and philanthropist.
Barbara Goldsmith, 85, American author, heart failure.
Samuel L. Green Jr., 89, American pastor and bishop (Church of God in Christ).
Andrés Hernández Ros, 67, Spanish politician, President of the Region of Murcia (1982–1984).
Henrietta Rach Hoernle, 103, German-born American philanthropist.
Ryan Jimmo, 34, Canadian mixed martial artist (UFC, MFC), traffic collision.
Kim Sung-min, 43, South Korean actor (Miss Mermaid), suicide by hanging.
Anatoliy Kutsev, 57, Moldovan-born Ukrainian football player, referee and manager (women's national team).
Alexander Litaay, 67, Indonesian ambassador, Ambassador to Croatia (since 2016), heart attack.
Hazel Newhook, 101, Canadian politician, MHA for Gander (1979–1985), Mayor of Gander (1973–1977).
Kavalam Narayana Panicker, 88, Indian dramatist, theatre director and poet.
Mike Pedicin, 98, American jazz bandleader.
John J. Santucci, 85, American lawyer and politician, New York state senator (1968–1976).
Gino Sovran, 91, Canadian basketball player (Toronto Huskies).
William C. Waterhouse, 74, American mathematician.
Rostislav Yankovsky, 86, Belarusian film and stage actor, People's Artist of the USSR (1978).

27
Franz Cibulka, 69, Austrian composer.
Adelmar Faria Coimbra-Filho, 92, Brazilian biologist.
Caçapava, 61, Brazilian footballer.
Elmer Cravalho, 90, American politician, Speaker of the Hawaii House of Representatives (1959–1967), Mayor of Maui (1969–1979).
Henry Sebastian D'Souza, 90, Indian Roman Catholic prelate, Archbishop of Calcutta (1986–2002).
Xerxes Desai, 79, Indian executive (Titan).
Pelle Gudmundsen-Holmgreen, 83, Danish composer, cancer.
Harry Halbreich, 85, Belgian musicologist.
Dave Heath, 85, American photographer.
Dame Grace Hollander, 94, New Zealand community leader.
Aharon Ipalé, 74, Moroccan-born Israeli actor (The Mummy, Fiddler on the Roof, Alias), cancer.
George W. Miller, 75, American federal judge.
Oh Se-jong, 33, South Korean short track speed skater, Olympic champion (2006), traffic collision.
Simon Ramo, 103, American engineer, businessman and author.
Mack Rice, 82, American songwriter ("Mustang Sally", "Respect Yourself") and singer, complications of Alzheimer's disease.
Edward D. Sheafer Jr., 75, American naval officer.
Bud Spencer, 86, Italian actor (They Call Me Trinity, Watch Out, We're Mad!, Who Finds a Friend Finds a Treasure) and swimmer.
Amar Suloev, 40, Armenian mixed martial artist, stomach cancer.
Alvin Toffler, 87, American writer and futurist (Future Shock, The Third Wave).

28
Leland Bardwell, 94, Irish poet, novelist and playwright.
Theo Dilissen, 62, Belgian basketball player and businessman.
Christer Ericsson, 74, Swedish businessman, drowning.
Freddie Gilroy, 80, Northern Irish bantamweight boxer, Olympic bronze medalist (1956).
Allan Greenshields, 90, Australian football player (Carlton, St Kilda).
André Guelfi, 97, French racing driver (Formula One).
Darell Koons, 91, American painter.
George Matsumoto, 93, American architect.
Joseph Atsumi Misue, 80, Japanese Roman Catholic prelate, Bishop of Hiroshima (1985–2011).
Scotty Moore, 84, American guitarist (Elvis Presley).
Fabiane Niclotti, 31, Brazilian model, Miss Universo Brasil 2004.
Buddy Ryan, 85, American football head coach (Philadelphia Eagles, Arizona Cardinals) and defensive coordinator (Chicago Bears, Houston Oilers).
Michel Soutif, 94, French physicist. 
Pat Summitt, 64, American basketball coach (Tennessee Lady Volunteers), dementia.
Zurlon Tipton, 26, American football player (Indianapolis Colts), shot.
Keith Vickerman, 83, British zoologist (University of Glasgow), Regius Professor of Zoology (1984–1998).

29
Elechi Amadi, 82, Nigerian writer.
Margaret Bakkes, 84, South African author.
Inocente Carreño, 96, Venezuelan composer.
James Cooley, 89, American mathematician.
Giuseppe De Andrea, 86, Italian-born American Roman Catholic prelate, Apostolic Nuncio to Bahrain, Kuwait, and Yemen (2001–2005), Qatar (2003–2005). 
John Farquharson, 86, Australian journalist.
Gunnar Garbo, 92, Norwegian politician, MP (1958–1973).
Stanley Gault, 90, American businessman, CEO of Rubbermaid and Goodyear.
Robert Marie Gay, 89, Canadian-born Ugandan Roman Catholic prelate, Bishop of Kabale (1996–2003).
Irving Gottesman, 85, American psychologist.
Carl Haas, 86, American car racing team owner.
Stan Harper, 94, American virtuoso harmonica player.
Jan Hettema, 82, South African Olympic cyclist (1956) and rally driver, shot.
Ojo Maduekwe, 71, Nigerian politician, Minister of Foreign Affairs (2007–2010).
Frode Nilsen, 92, Norwegian diplomat.
Veena Sahasrabuddhe, 67, Indian singer and composer.
Edward L. Salmon Jr., 82, American Episcopal prelate, Bishop of South Carolina (1990–2008).
Douglas W. Schwartz, 86, American archaeologist.
Vasyl Slipak, 41, Ukrainian opera singer, shot.
K. G. Subramanyan, 92, Indian artist.
Arthur Underwood, 88, English cricketer.
Rob Wasserman, 64, American musician (David Grisman Quintet, RatDog, Lou Reed), cancer.
*Xu Jiatun, 100, Chinese politician and dissident, Governor of Jiangsu (1977–1979).

30
Charlie Akers, 76, American Olympic biathlete.
Ann Cartwright DeCouto, 75, Bermudian politician, Deputy Premier (1989–1992).
Don Friedman, 81, American jazz pianist.
Paul T. Gillcrist, 87, American rear admiral.
Gian Corrado Gross, 74, Italian Olympic swimmer (1964).
Juan Habichuela, 83, Spanish flamenco guitarist.
Sir Geoffrey Hill, 84, British poet.
Quasar Khanh, 82, Vietnamese inventor and designer.
Al Libous, 88, American politician, Mayor of Binghamton, New York (1969–1981). 
Tupay Loong, 69, Filipino politician, Governor of Sulu (1984–1996), liver cancer. 
Martin Lundström, 98, Swedish cross-country skier, Olympic champion (1948).
Gordon Murray, 95, British puppeteer and television producer (Trumpton, Camberwick Green, Chigley).
Joe Scott, 90, American football player (New York Giants).
Robert Squires, 89, British vice admiral.
Thunder, 35, Australian professional wrestler (CMLL), stomach cancer.
Witold Zagórski, 85, Polish basketball player (national team) and coach.

References

2016-06
 06